Pseudooceanicola antarcticus is a Gram-negative, aerobic, moderately halophilic and rod-shaped bacterium from the genus of Pseudooceanicola which has been isolated from  seawater.

References 

Rhodobacteraceae
Bacteria described in 2014